Kaveri Priyam (born 22 October) is an Indian actress who primarily works in Hindi television. She is best known for her portrayals of Kuhu Maheshwari Rajvansh in Yeh Rishtey Hain Pyaar Ke and Dr. Monami Mahajan in Ziddi Dil Maane Na. Currently, she plays Amrita in Sony SAB's Dil Diyaan Gallaan.

Early life
Kaveri Priyam was born on October 22 in Bokaro, Jharkhand. She did her schooling from Bokaro's St. Xavier School and graduated from Vellore Institute of Technology, Vellore. After completing her studies, she came to Mumbai and started her career as a model by doing print shoots and advertisements. She has a younger brother, Ritesh Anand with whom she runs a restaurant Konkan Chilly in Mumbai.

Career
Priyam debuted with Naagin 2 as Madhu Makkhi. She then appeared in Pardes Mein Hai Mera Dil and in Savdhaan India. She made her film debut with Tishnagi in 2018.

Priyam joined Rajan Shahi's Yeh Rishtey Hain Pyaar Ke, a Star Plus series, in 2019 as Kuhu Maheshwari Rajvansh opposite Ritvik Arora and Avinash Mishra, which proved to be her breakthrough role. Simultaneously, she also appeared in Shahi's another production, a romantic drama series Yeh Rishta Kya Kehlata Hai, for its integration episodes in March 2019 as Kuhu.

In 2021, Priyam was seen as Dr. Monami Mahajan, in Sony SAB show Ziddi Dil Maane Na  opposite Shaleen Malhotra which ended on 4 June 2022. Currently, she is playing Amrita Kaur Brar in Sony SAB show Dil Diyaan Gallaan opposite Paras Arora.

Filmography

Films

Television

Special appearance

Music videos

Awards

See also 
List of Indian television actresses
List of Hindi television actresses

References

External links

Indian television actresses
Indian film actresses
Living people
1994 births